is a former Japanese football player.

Playing career
Hisanaga was born in Aira on December 23, 1977. After graduating from high school, he joined newly was promoted to the J1 League club, Avispa Fukuoka in 1996. He played many matches during his first season. However the club results were poor and it was demoted to the J2 League in 2002. That year, he moved to Yokohama F. Marinos on loan. He played many matches and the club won second place in the 2002 J1 League. In 2003, he returned to Avispa. However he did not play much and in 2004, he moved to the J2 club Omiya Ardija. He played as a regular player and the club was promoted to J1 in 2005. In 2007, he returned to Avispa again. He played as a regular player until 2008. However he did not play in any matches in 2009 and left the club at the end of the 2009 season. In July 2010, he moved to his local club Volca Kagoshima in the Regional Leagues. He retired at the end of the 2010 season.

Club statistics

References

External links

1977 births
Living people
Association football people from Kagoshima Prefecture
Japanese footballers
J1 League players
J2 League players
Avispa Fukuoka players
Yokohama F. Marinos players
Omiya Ardija players
Association football midfielders